Vincentown is an unincorporated community and census-designated place (CDP) located on the South Branch Rancocas Creek in Southampton Township of Burlington County, New Jersey. The area is served as United States Postal Service ZIP code 08088.

As of the 2010 United States Census, the population for ZIP Code Tabulation Area 08088 was 24,664.

Demographics

History
In 1743, Vincent Leeds purchased the land where the community is now built. It was later named after him, Vincent's Town. Previously, the village had been known as Brimstone Neck.

Historic district

The Vincentown Historic District is a  historic district roughly bounded by Mill, Church, Pleasant, Main, and Race Streets, and Red Lion Road encompassing the community. It was added to the National Register of Historic Places on September 21, 1988 for its significance in architecture, commerce, industry, religion, and social history. The district includes 160 contributing buildings and 3 contributing sites. The John Woolston House, a two and one-half story brick house with Federal style, was previously documented by the Historic American Buildings Survey in 1938. The house at 57 Main Street is a three story Italianate style house featuring a cupola with a tree-type finial. It was built  and is a key contributing property.

Transportation
Red Lion Airport is located in Vincentown.

Points of interest
 The Pinelands Preservation Alliance has its headquarters and visitor center at the Bishop–Irick Farmstead, which is listed on the NRHP.
 DeMastro Vineyards

Notable people

People who were born in, residents of, or otherwise closely associated with Vincentown include:
 Samuel A. Dobbins (1814–1886), represented New Jersey's 2nd congressional district in the United States House of Representatives from 1873–1877.
 Brad Ecklund (1922–2010), center who played five seasons in the NFL.
 Job H. Lippincott (1842–1900), United States Attorney for the District of New Jersey and Associate Justice of the New Jersey Supreme Court.
 Chauncey Morehouse (1902–1980), jazz drummer.
 Jim Saxton (born 1943), Congressman from 1984 to 2009.
 Beulah Woolston (1828–1886), pioneering missionary teacher in China.

See also
 National Register of Historic Places listings in Burlington County, New Jersey

References

External links
 
 
Vincent Fire Company
Preservation Commission of Historic Southampton

Southampton Township, New Jersey
Populated places in the Pine Barrens (New Jersey)
Unincorporated communities in Burlington County, New Jersey
Unincorporated communities in New Jersey
Census-designated places in Burlington County, New Jersey